Rozovsky is a rural locality (a khutor) in Iskrinskoye Rural Settlement, Uryupinsky District, Volgograd Oblast, Russia. The population was 60 as of 2010.

Geography 
Rozovsky is located in steppe, 48 km west of Uryupinsk (the district's administrative centre) by road. Dubrovsky is the nearest rural locality.

References 

Rural localities in Uryupinsky District